Bishop Richard B. Wilke created The DISCIPLE Bible Study with his wife, Julia. This training for Christian leaders has been completed by nearly two million graduates in more than 10,000 congregations and 30 denominations.  The DISCIPLE series is now available in German, Korean, Spanish, and Chinese.

Books 
Pastor and Marriage Group Counseling, Abingdon Press, 1974.
Tell Me Again I'm Listening, Festival Books, 1977.
Our Father, Abingdon Press, 1978.
And Are We Yet Alive? The Future of the United Methodist Church, Abingdon Press, 1986.
Signs and Wonders: The Mighty Work of God in the Church, Abingdon Press, 1989.
The Tie That Binds: Connecting With God, the Church, and the World, Abingdon Press, 2008.

Episcopacy & District Superintendency 
Bishop Wilke served as District Superintendent of the Winfield District in the Kansas Conference from 1971 to 1973.
Bishop Wilke was elected to the episcopacy of the United Methodist Church in 1984.
Bishop Wilke served for 12 years (1984-1996) in the Arkansas area.

Local Church Ministry 

United Methodist Churches in Scandia, Kansas
Pleasant Valley in Wichita, Kansas
University United Methodist in Salina, Kansas
Senior Pastor, First United Methodist Church in Wichita, Kansas (11 years)

Other 
Bishop Wilke introduced Hillary Clinton when she addressed the 1996 General Conference of the United Methodist Church.

Bishop Wilke was recognized in 2005 by Yale Divinity School for Distinction in Ordained Ministry

References

External links 
Biography on The Institute for Discipleship website
DISCIPLE Bible Study Information
The dedication of the Richard and Julia Wilke Institute for Discipleship at Southwestern College (Winfield, Kansas)

United Methodist Church
Living people
Year of birth missing (living people)